Handcuffed is a 1929 American silent mystery film directed by Duke Worne and starring Virginia Brown Faire, Wheeler Oakman and Dean Jagger.

Synopsis
Gerald Morely's father is ruined in a stock fraud and commits suicide. When shortly afterwards the man who perpetrated it is murdered, the evidence is framed so that Gerald appears guilty.

Cast
 Virginia Brown Faire as Gloria Randall
 Wheeler Oakman as Tom Bennett
 Dean Jagger as Gerald Morely
 James Harrison as Billy Hatton
 Broderick O'Farrell as John Randall
 George Chesebro as Detective

References

Bibliography
 Munden, Kenneth White. The American Film Institute Catalog of Motion Pictures Produced in the United States, Part 1. University of California Press, 1997.

External links
 

1929 films
1929 mystery films
1920s English-language films
American silent feature films
American mystery films
Films directed by Duke Worne
Rayart Pictures films
1920s American films
Silent mystery films